Metralindole (Inkazan) is a reversible inhibitor of monoamine oxidase A (RIMA) which was investigated in Russia as a potential antidepressant.  It is structurally and pharmacologically related to pirlindole.

See also 
 Pirlindole
 Tetrindole

References 

beta-Carbolines
Tryptamines
Reversible inhibitors of MAO-A
Antidepressants
Monoamine oxidase inhibitors
Russian drugs